This is a list of Swedish military aircraft since its start.  It is not guaranteed to be up-to-date or to be accurate, or complete. Aircraft still in service noted.

Early aircraft

Early balloons of the Army and Navy

Early Navy
(The aviation corps became a separate organization in 1915.)

Early Army
(The aviation corps became a separate organization in 1915.)

Air Force (1926–40)
Created in July of 1926.

Later XX implies later redesignation.

Fighters (Jakt)

Bombers (Bomb), torpedo bombers (Torped) and ground attack (Attack)

Reconnaissance (Spaning)

Transport (Transport)

Trainers (Skol) and advanced trainers (Övning)

Experimental/prototype/projects (Prov)

Undesignated/Miscellaneous
Not used by air force

Gliders
 G = Glidflygplan "glider"
 Se = Segelflygplan, "soarer" (sailplane),
 Lg = Lastglidare, "transport glider"

Post-1940 designation system
(Aircraft still in service have a light green background.)

Main list

Helicopters (Helikopter)

Navy

Army

Common helicopter wing
Helicopters that entered after a 1998 re-organisation/merger.

All the above active helicopters that were active were merged into this service.

Unmanned aerial vehicles

See also
 Swedish Armed Forces
 Swedish Air Force
 Swedish Army
 Swedish Navy

References

External links

 Swedish military aircraft designations
 Swedish military aviation
 World air forces: Sweden

Sweden Military Aircraft

Aircraft
Sweden